Aloeides mbuluensis, the Mbulu copper, is a butterfly of the family Lycaenidae. It is found in South Africa, where it is known from bare patches of ground in highland grassveld in the Mbulu area of the Eastern Cape and the area near Loteni in KwaZulu-Natal.

The wingspan is 26–32 mm for males and 29–37 mm females. Adults are on wing from November to January. There is one generation per year.

References

Butterflies described in 1994
Aloeides
Endemic butterflies of South Africa